One Model Nation is a graphic novel by Jim Rugg and Dandy Warhols frontman Courtney Taylor-Taylor about a fictional 1970s German krautrock band. It was released on 11 November 2009. An accompanying studio album titled Totalwerks, Vol. 1 (1969–1977), a greatest hits album by the fictional band, was released on 31 January 2012.

Critical reception 

Wired called it "intriguing and humorous". Film director Gus Van Sant called it an "Awesomely executed story by Courtney Taylor-Taylor. Great art – you must read it." Ain't It Cool News wrote that it was "worth a look if you haven't read it already, especially if you're an indie comics fan. It's a good story that should appeal to those who like comics that have realistic characters along with a small bit of socio-political history mixed in."

Track listing

References

External links 

 
 
 Courtney Taylor-Taylor on the inspiration behind the project
 Exclusive preview of the book at rollingstone.com

Image Comics graphic novels
2009 comics debuts